The following is a list of achievements of esports organization Virtus.pro in CS:GO.

Achievements 
Bold denotes a CS:GO Major
Italics denote a CS:GO Minor / RMR events

2013 
 3rd - Copenhagen Games 2013
 1st - SLTV StarSeries V 2013

2014 
 2nd - Copenhagen Games 2014
 1st - EMS One Katowice 2014
 5–8th	- ESL One Cologne 2014
 3rd–4th - DreamHack Winter 2014

2015 
 3rd–4th - ESL One Katowice 2015
 3rd–4th - ESL ESEA Pro League Season 1 - Finals
 3rd–4th - ESL One Cologne 2015
 5–8th	- DreamHack Open Cluj-Napoca 2015
 3rd–4th - FACEIT 2015 Stage 3 Finals
 1st - ESL ESEA Dubai Invitational 2015

2016 
 5–6th	- Intel Extreme Masters X - World Championship
 5–8th	- MLG Major Championship: Columbus
 1st - SL i-League Invitational: Kyiv
 3rd–4th - ESL One Cologne 2016
 1st - ELEAGUE Season 1
 1st - Dreamhack Bucharest 2016
 2nd - ESL One New York 2016
 2nd - EPICENTER 2016

2017 
 2nd - ELEAGUE Major 2017
 1st - DreamHack Masters Las Vegas 2017
 1st - Adrenaline Cyber League
 3rd–4th - PGL Major Kraków 2017
 2nd - EPICENTER 2017
 2nd - SL i-League Invitational Shanghai 2017

2018 
 15–16th - ELEAGUE Major: Boston 2018
 12–14th - StarSeries i-League season 4
 13–16th - IEM Katowice 2018
 12–14th - StarSeries i-League season 5
 2nd - V4 Future Sport Festival
 3rd - IEM Shanghai 2018
 23rd–24th - FACEIT Major: London 2018
 5th - BLAST Pro Series Istanbul 2018

2019 
 7–8th - Charleroi Esports
 2nd - ESL Polish Championship Spring 2019 Finals 
 3rd–4th - Moche XL Esports 2019
 3rd–4th - Good Game League 2019 
 1st - Polish Esport League Spring 2019 Finals	
 7–8th - EPICENTER 2019

2020 
 5–6th - ICE Challenge 2020
 13–16th - IEM Katowice 2020
 13–15th - ESL Pro League Season 11: Europe
 4th - ESL One: Road to Rio - CIS
 1st - BLAST Premier CIS Cup
 3rd - WePlay! Clutch Island
 1st - IEM XV New-York Online: CIS
 1st - Flashpoint Season 2
 1st - DreamHack Open December 2020

2021 
 1st - cs_summit 7	
 2nd - Intel Extreme Masters XV - World Championship
 7–8th - ESL Pro League Season 13
 7–8th - DreamHack Masters Spring 2021
 2nd - EPIC CIS League Spring 2021
 5–6th - IEM XVI Summer
 9–10th - StarLadder CIS RMR 2021
 5–6th - IEM Cologne 2021
 13–16th - ESL Pro League Season 14
 1st - Pinnacle Fall Series #1
 4th - IEM XVI Fall: CIS
 5–8th - BLAST Premier: Fall Showdown 2021
 5–8th - PGL Major Stockholm 2021

2022 
 1st - ESL Challenger #48
 5–6th - IEM XVI - Katowice

as Outsiders
 12–14th - PGL Major Antwerp 2022
 2nd - ESL Challenger at DreamHack Valencia 2022
 5–8th - ESL Pro League Season 16
 1st - ESL Challenger at DreamHack Rotterdam 2022
 1st - IEM Rio Major 2022

References 

Virtus.pro
Virtus